The Cape Cod Times is a broadsheet daily newspaper serving Barnstable County, Massachusetts, United States, which encompasses 15 towns on Cape Cod with a year-round population of about 230,000. It is owned by Gannett, which also owns several weekly newspapers in the county.

History
The paper was first published by businessman J.P. Dunn and Basil Brewer on October 19, 1936 as the Cape Cod Standard-Times, and was distributed jointly on the Cape with The New Bedford Standard-Times until the end of 1970. It was first published as an independent daily for Cape Cod on January 1, 1971 and renamed the Cape Cod Times from September 2, 1975.

The first issues were printed in a converted automobile dealer's garage on Elm Street in Hyannis, now a bus garage. Less than a year after the paper made its debut, plans were announced for the construction of a building at 319 Main Street, which has remained the Times home since early 1938.

As the newspapers entered the late 1960s, it became evident that the historic piggy-back distribution arrangement with the New Bedford paper had outlived its usefulness. Population and business activity on the Cape were growing at a rapid rate and research studies indicated that readers and commercial supporters would support an independent daily newspaper for Cape Cod. In 1970, the decision was made to break away and the new daily Cape Cod Standard-Times was born.

In 1975, to dispel any impression of still being an offshoot of the New Bedford paper, the Cape Cod paper was renamed the Cape Cod Times. A front-page editorial that day proclaimed:

We adopted the new name because we want it clearly known that we are an independent Cape Cod newspaper, printed and published on the Cape, by Cape Codders, for Cape Codders.

News Corp. acquired the Times when it bought Dow Jones & Company (which itself had purchased Ottaway in 1970) for US$5 billion in late 2007. Rupert Murdoch, the head of News Corp., reportedly told investors before the deal that he would be "selling the local newspapers fairly quickly" after the Dow Jones purchase.

On September 4, 2013, News Corp announced that it would sell the Dow Jones Local Media Group to Newcastle Investment Corp.—an affiliate of Fortress Investment Group, for $87 million. The newspapers were operated by GateHouse Media, a newspaper group owned by Fortress. News Corp. CEO and former Wall Street Journal editor Robert James Thomson indicated that the newspapers were "not strategically consistent with the emerging portfolio" of the company.  GateHouse in turn filed prepackaged Chapter 11 bankruptcy on September 27, 2013, to restructure its debt obligations in order to accommodate the acquisition.

In November 2019, GateHouse, which then owned 154 dailies in 39 states, merged with Gannett, the owner of more than 100 daily community newspapers as well as USA Today. Gannett was chosen as the brand name for the merged holding companies, which replaced Gatehouse as the largest corporate owner of U.S. newspapers. The merger required a $1.8 billion loan to pay off the financial obligations of GateHouse’s owner, New Media Investment Group. The more than $300 million annual debt service explains Gannett's subsequent severe and progressive reduction in the newsroom budgets of the newspapers it owned. Gannett could not simultaneously pay off its debt, reward its shareholders, and adequately support its newsrooms. The Cape Cod Times became a victim of the merger.

In March 2020, Gannett sold the landmark Times headquarters building at 319 Main Street in Hyannis. The Times then leased space in the building it had owned for more than 80 years. The sale was consistent with Gannett’s practice of selling capital assets of newspapers it owned to generate funds to pay off its huge merger-enabling loan from Apollo Global Management.

Today's Times 

A period of journalistic excellence at The Cape Cod Times was ushered in by some outstanding investigative reporting 20+ years ago. Particularly noteworthy was a 1997 series titled "Broken Trust," written by two Times reporters who spent five months tracking down details of contamination of Cape Cod’s aquifer by extensive underground pollution originating at the Massachusetts Military Reservation. The six-part series caught the attention of the Environmental Protection Agency, which suspended the use of live explosives, propellants, flares, and lead bullets on the military reservation – the first time in American history that the EPA imposed any restrictions on a branch of the U.S. military.

In 2007, the Suburban Newspapers of America named the Cape Cod Times "Newspaper of the Year," with the American Press Institute judging the Times to be "one of the country's elite newspapers." The following year (2008), the New England Press Association named the Times "Newspaper of the Year." In 2016, GateHouse Media, the owner of the Times and more than 150 other U.S. dailies, honored executive editor Paul Pronovost as the "Best of GateHouse Editor of the Year." A journalistic pinnacle was reached two years later (in 2018), when the New England Newspaper & Press Association bestowed the Cape Cod Times with 43 awards, including ten first-place citations.

Signs of serious trouble at the Times began to appear the next year (in November 2019) when Pronovost resigned as executive editor. He left the newsroom he had called home for 19 years to become the communications director at a small New Hampshire college. In a parting memorandum to his staff, he wrote, "I do feel deep regret for not being able to hold the line on some of my core principles. In many ways, I feel I’ve failed you all and those who are no longer working at 319," the newsroom’s Main Street address. "That’s one of the reasons I know it’s time to move on: I am not able to give you what you need and deserve."

Five months later (in April 2020), Gannett’s newsroom purge Pronovost anticipated struck forcefully. Included in that round of cuts was Bill Mills, the opinion page editor who two decades earlier had been one of the investigative reporters who wrote "Broken Trust." Also laid off was Tim Miller, the features editor whose movie reviews had been must-reads for more than a generation of Times readers. His final column, which was published on May 1, 2020, was titled "Dear readers, thanks for a great 36 years."

On May 24, 2020, Anne Brennan, the new executive editor, informed readers about another result of Gannett’s budgetary constraints in an article titled "The Cape Cod Times will no longer take editorial positions, endorse politicians." Until then, a daily editorial written jointly by the executive editor, opinion editor, and publisher served as a moral compass for the Cape Cod community. Similarly, senior Times editors had previously vetted candidates for major elected positions on Cape Cod in face-to-face meetings at the Times headquarters. The editors subsequently wrote endorsements of top candidates, reporting their positions on important issues and explaining why the Times thought them meritorious. Those features, which had provided a valuable community service, required editorial resources that were no longer available because of Gannett’s budget cuts.

Some readers responded to Brennan’s editorial cutbacks with online comments lamenting the Times’ journalistic decline. One reader wrote an op-ed published in another Cape Cod newspaper headlined "What Has Happened to the Cape Cod Times?" The author of a book chronicling the adverse effects of corporate ownership on community newspapers used the Cape Cod Times as a case study.

The Times’ decline has continued as Gannett further restricted the newsroom's budget. The newsroom staff shrank by half over 6 years – from 32 to 15 between 2016 and 2022. Because newsroom resources have become insufficient for thorough and in-depth coverage of the local news, Cape Cod’s only daily newspaper has increasingly become more an aggregator of articles generated elsewhere and less a primary gatherer and reporter of the local news. Opinion pieces previously written by members of the local community have been replaced by points of view expressed by authors in distant places and borrowed from other media. Some familiar columns written by local contributors continue to appear at regular intervals.

In June 2022, the Cape Cod Times followed Gannett’s lead regarding opinion pieces and reduced its opinion content still further. Some analysts interpreted Gannett’s position as economically driven because editorial positions sometimes alienate readers. Critics questioned the value of a publication that doesn’t stand for something. The Times now limits publication of letters to the editor and op-ed pieces to the Saturday and Sunday editions.

Times movie buffs have missed Tim Miller's previously must-read movie reviews since April 2020, when they disappeared following the newsroom purge in which Gannett laid off Miller, the former features editor. His final column was titled " Dear readers, thanks for a great 36 years." Theater goers currently benefit from excellent theater reviews written by entertainment editor Kathi Scrizzi Driscoll.

Images have been an important part of the Times' locally generated content. Photojournalists Ron Schloerb, Steve Heaslop, and Merrily Cassidy are among the paper's longest tenured staff, having been employed for 44, 41, and 14 years, respectively.

In March 2022, the Cape Cod Times stopped publishing a print edition on Saturdays, a move that was part of Gannett’s eliminating Saturday print editions at half of the more than 250 daily U.S. newspapers it owned.

See also
 List of newspapers in Massachusetts

Footnotes

External links 
 

1936 establishments in Massachusetts
Gannett publications
Mass media in Barnstable County, Massachusetts
Martha's Vineyard
Nantucket, Massachusetts
Publications established in 1936
Newspapers published in Massachusetts